African-Americans make up 12% of the American population and there are several holidays that celebrate them.

Federal holidays

The following are African-American federal holidays in the United States:

State holidays

The following are African-American holidays celebrated in at least one US State or territory:

Municipal holidays

The following African-American holidays are celebrated by different municipalities:

Other

The following are non-government African American holidays:

References

Public holidays in the United States
African-American culture
African-American events